Pivijay is a town and municipality of the Colombian Department of Magdalena. Founded in 1774 by José Flores, Julian Valera y Antonio Sánchez. Promoted to municipality in 1912.

Politics

Administrative divisions
Corregimientos: 
Avianca
Canoas
Caraballo
Chinoblas
Garrapatas
Las Piedras
Media Luna
Paraco (Carmen del Magdalena)
Paraíso
Piñuelas
Placitas
Salaminita

References

External links
 Gobernacion del Magdalena: municipios - Pivijay
 Pivijay official website

Municipalities of Magdalena Department